Marcelo David Báez Casco (born 14 January 1991), known as Marcelo Báez, is a Paraguyan footballer who plays as a defender for Guaireña.

References

External links

 

1991 births
Living people
Paraguayan footballers
Paraguayan expatriate footballers
Association football defenders
Club Atlético 3 de Febrero players
Sportivo Luqueño players
Club Libertad footballers
Club Guaraní players
Paraná Clube players
Paraguayan Primera División players
Campeonato Brasileiro Série A players
Sportspeople from Ciudad del Este
Paraguayan expatriate sportspeople in Brazil
Expatriate footballers in Brazil
21st-century Paraguayan people